Christian existentialism is a theo-philosophical movement which takes an existentialist approach to Christian theology. The school of thought is often traced back to the work of the Danish philosopher and theologian Søren Kierkegaard (1813–1855) who is widely regarded as the father of existentialism.

Kierkegaardian themes

Christian existentialism relies on Kierkegaard's understanding of Christianity.  Kierkegaard argued that the universe is fundamentally paradoxical, and that its greatest paradox is the transcendent union of God and humans in the person of Jesus Christ. He also posited having a personal relationship with God that supersedes all prescribed moralities, social structures and communal norms, since he asserted that following social conventions is essentially a personal aesthetic choice made by individuals.

Kierkegaard proposed that each person must make independent choices, which then constitute their existence. Each person suffers from the anguish of indecision (whether knowingly or unknowingly) until they commit to a particular choice about the way to live. Kierkegaard also proposed three rubrics with which to understand the conditions that issue from distinct life choices: the aesthetic, the ethical, and the religious.

Major premises
One of the major premises of Kierkegaardian Christian existentialism entails calling the masses back to a more genuine form of Christianity. This form is often identified with some notion of Early Christianity, which mostly existed during the first three centuries after Christ's crucifixion. Beginning with the Edict of Milan, which was issued by Roman Emperor Constantine I in AD 313, Christianity enjoyed a level of popularity among Romans and later among other Europeans. And yet Kierkegaard asserted that by the 19th century, the ultimate meaning of New Testament Christianity (love, cf. agape, mercy and loving-kindness) had become perverted, and Christianity had deviated considerably from its original threefold message of grace, humility, and love.

Another major premise of Kierkegaardian Christian existentialism involves Kierkegaard's conception of God and Love. For the most part, Kierkegaard equates God with Love. Thus, when a person engages in the act of loving, he is in effect achieving an aspect of the divine. Kierkegaard also viewed the individual as a necessary synthesis of both finite and infinite elements. Therefore, when an individual does not come to a full realization of his infinite side, he is said to be in despair. For many contemporary Christian theologians, the notion of despair can be viewed as sin. However, to Kierkegaard, a man sinned when he was exposed to this idea of despair and chose a path other than one in accordance with God's will.

A final major premise of Kierkegaardian Christian existentialism entails the systematic undoing of evil acts. Kierkegaard asserted that once an action had been completed, it should be evaluated in the face of God, for holding oneself up to divine scrutiny was the only way to judge one's actions. Because actions constitute the manner in which something is deemed good or bad, one must be constantly conscious of the potential consequences of his actions. Kierkegaard believed that the choice for goodness ultimately came down to each individual. Yet Kierkegaard also foresaw the potential limiting of choices for individuals who fell into despair.

The Bible
Christian Existentialism often refers to what it calls the indirect style of Christ's teachings, which it considers to be a distinctive and important aspect of his ministry.  Christ's point, it says, is often left unsaid in any particular parable or saying, to permit each individual to confront the truth on his own. This is particularly evident in (but is certainly not limited to) his parables; for example in the Gospel of Matthew. 

An existential reading of the Bible demands that the reader recognize that he is an existing subject, studying the words that God communicates to him personally. This is in contrast to looking at a collection of truths which are outside and unrelated to the reader. Such a reader is not obligated to follow the commandments as if an external agent is forcing them upon him, but as though they are inside him and guiding him internally. This is the task Kierkegaard takes up when he asks: "Who has the more difficult task: the teacher who lectures on earnest things a meteor's distance from everyday life, or the learner who should put it to use?" Existentially speaking, the Bible doesn't become an authority in a person's life until they permit the Bible to be their personal authority.

Notable Christian existentialists
Christian existentialists include German Protestant theologians Paul Tillich and Rudolf Bultmann, American existential psychologist Rollo May (who introduced much of Tillich's thought to a general American readership), British Anglican theologian John Macquarrie, American philosopher Clifford Williams, French Catholic philosophers Gabriel Marcel, Louis Lavelle, Emmanuel Mounier and Pierre Boutang and French Protestant Paul Ricœur, German philosopher Karl Jaspers, Spanish philosopher Miguel de Unamuno, and Russian philosophers Nikolai Berdyaev and Lev Shestov. Karl Barth added to Kierkegaard's ideas the notion that existential despair leads an individual to an awareness of God's infinite nature. Russian author Fyodor Dostoevsky could be placed within the tradition of Christian existentialism.

The roots of existentialism have been traced back as far as Augustine of Hippo. Some of the most striking passages in Pascal's Pensées, including the famous section on the Wager, deal with existentialist themes. Jacques Maritain, in Existence and the Existent: An Essay on Christian Existentialism, finds the core of true existentialism in the thought of Thomas Aquinas.

Existential Theology 

In the monograph, Existential Theology: An Introduction (2020), Hue Woodson provides a constructive primer to the field and, he argues, thinkers that can be considered more broadly as engaging with existential theology, defining a French school including Gabriel Marcel, Jacques Maritain, and Jean-Luc Marion, a German school including Immanuel Kant, Johann Gottlieb Fichte, Friedrich Wilhelm Joseph Schelling, Georg Wilhelm Friedrich Hegel, and Dietrich Bonhoeffer, and a Russian school including Fyodor Dostoyevsky, Leo Tolstoy, and Nikolai Berdyaev.

Radical Existential Christianity 
It has been claimed that Radical Existential Christians’ faith is based in their sensible and immediate and direct experience of God indwelling in human terms. It is suggested that individuals do not make or create their Christian existence; it does not come as a result of a decision one personally makes. The radical Protestants of the 17th century, for example Quakers may have been in some ways theo-philosophically aligned with radical existential Christianity.

Further reading 

 Cobb, John B. (1967). The Structure of Christian Existence(Philadelphia: The Westminster Press) 
 Cochrane, Arthur (1956). The Existentialists and God (Dubuque: The University of Dubuque Press)
 Davis, George W. (1957). Existentialism and Theology: An Investigation of the Contribution of Rudolf Bultmann to Theological Thought (New York: Philosophical Library)
 Heinemann, F. H. (1958). Existentialism and the Modern Predicament (New York: Harper and Row) 
 Jansen, G. M, A. (1966). An Existential Approach to Theology (Milwaukee: The Bruce Publishing Company)
 Jenkins, David. (1987). The Scope and Limits of John Macquarrie's Existential Theology (Stockholm: Uppsala)
 Kuitert, H. M. (1968). The Reality of Faith: A Way Between Protestant Orthodoxy and Existentialist Theology (Grand Rapids: Eerdmans)
 Macquarrie, John (1957). An Existentialist Theology: A Comparison of Heidegger and Bultmann (New York: The Macmillian Company)
 Martin, Bernard (1963). The Existentialist Theology of Paul Tillich (New Haven: College and University Press)
 Michalson, Carl, ed. (1956). Christianity and the Existentialists (New York: Charles Scribner's Sons) 
 Slaate, Howard A. (1971). The Paradox of Existentialist Theology: The Dialectics of a Faith-Subsumed Reason-in-Existence (New York: Humanities Press)
 Spier, J. M. (1953), Christianity and Existentialism (Philadelphia: The Presbyterian and Reformed Publishing Company)
 Stagg, Frank. (1973). Polarities of Man's Existence in Biblical Perspective (Philadelphia: The Westminster Press)
 Williams, J. Rodman. (1965). Contemporary Existentialism and Christian Faith (Englewood Cliffs: Prentice Fall)
 Woodson, Hue. (2020). Existential Theology: An Introduction (Eugene: Wipf and Stock)

See also

References

External links
 A website that explores the existential teachings of Jesus, with references to Kierkegaard and Tillich

 
Christian philosophy
existentialism
Existentialism
Political theories
Religious existentialism
Søren Kierkegaard
Types of existentialism